Cobblestones Museum is a regional early settlers museum in Greytown, New Zealand. The museum is located at site of the original Cobb and Co coaching stables. The museum contains several buildings recognised as historic by the New Zealand Historic Places Trust, these include:
a colonial cottage (built c.1867),
Wairarapa's first Public Hospital in Greytown (built 1875),
Wairarapa's first Methodist church (built 1865),
the single-teacher Mangapakeha country school building which opened in 1902
The Cobb and Co Stables. and
the Donald Woolshed (built 1858), Wairarapa's first purpose built woolshed.

Exhibition Centre 
The Exhibition Centre features Wairarapa heritage stories, objects, photos and machinery. Finished in November 2014 after many years of fundraising it also hold the collection room which curates objects within the collection.

A major new commemorative exhibition looking back on World War 1 is being planned for November 2018. This will focus on the impact of the war on Greytown and the surrounding region from the perspective of the returned servicemen, and commemorate the lives of local soldiers who did not return.

Cobblestones Park & Gardens 
The historic village at Cobblestones is set within in a leafy park where many New Zealand native and exotic tree abound. The variety of native and exotic trees at Cobblestones befits Greytown's significance as the first New Zealand town to celebrate Arbor Day. Native kahikatea, kowhai, totara and karaka can be seen together with exotic trees, maples, ash and fruit trees of early settlers' gardens. Cobblestones Museum Garden is a popular Wairarapa garden tour and wedding venue.

References

External links 

 Cobblestones Museum

Buildings and structures in the Wairarapa
Heritage New Zealand Category 2 historic places in the Wellington Region
Museums in the Wellington Region
History museums in New Zealand
Open-air museums in New Zealand
Greytown, New Zealand